Alakol (also, Alagël’ and Alakël) is a village and municipality in the Tovuz Rayon of Azerbaijan. It has a population of 3,556.

References 

Populated places in Tovuz District